False eye may refer to:

 Ocular prosthesis
 An intersection in the game of Go that appears safe but can be taken. See Go (board game)
 Eyespot, a pattern of feathers, scales or skin pigmentation that looks like an eye